What is Free to a Good Home? is the first extended play (EP) by Emily Haines & The Soft Skeleton. The EP consists of five new songs and a remix, including previously unreleased tracks from the sessions of Knives Don't Have Your Back. It was released July 24, 2007 in Canada and the United States on Last Gang Records. The title of the EP comes from a poem by Emily Haines' father, Paul Haines.

Track listing 
 "Rowboat"
 "The Bank"
 "Telethon"
 "Bottom of the World"
 "Sprig"
 "Mostly Waving" (todorK remix)

Personnel 
 Emily Haines — vocals, piano
 Justin Peroff — drums on "The Bank"
 Jimmy Shaw — trumpet on "Rowboat", "Telethon", "The Bank" and "Mostly Waving"; harmonium on The "Bank"
 Evan Cranley — trombone on "Rowboat", "Telethon", "The Bank" and "Mostly Waving"
 Chris Seligman — French horn on "Rowboat", "Telethon", "The Bank" and "Mostly Waving"
 Lance Barrington — guest vocals on "Mostly Waving"
 David Newfeld — strings, guitar, synth and bass on "Sprig"

2007 EPs
Emily Haines albums